Julio Alberto Borbón (born February 20, 1986) is an American former professional baseball center fielder and current Assistant Coordinator of Player Development for the Minnesota Twins. He played in Major League Baseball (MLB) for the Texas Rangers, Chicago Cubs, and Baltimore Orioles. He also played for the Sultanes de Monterrey, Pericos de Puebla, and the Acereros de Monclova of the Mexican Baseball League.

College career
Borbón attended the University of Tennessee. In , Borbón helped the Volunteers reach the College World Series and was third on the team with a .350 batting average. His teammates that year included current major leaguers Chase Headley of the San Diego Padres and Luke Hochevar of the Kansas City Royals. After the 2005 season, he played collegiate summer baseball with the Cotuit Kettleers of the Cape Cod Baseball League.

Professional career

Texas Rangers
Entering the 2007 Major League Baseball draft, Borbón was ranked the 19th-best overall prospect by Baseball America. In the draft, he was taken in the supplemental round by the Texas Rangers as the 35th overall pick.

On August 16, 2007, Borbón signed a four-year major league contract worth $1.3 million, with a $800,000 signing bonus. Because he was signed to a major league contract, Borbón was placed on the Rangers 40-man roster and was optioned to Single-A Spokane. At Spokane, he played in 7 games and had a .172 batting average. He was then sent to play rookie ball for the Surprise Rangers and played two games for them.

On June 29, 2009, Borbón made his major league debut with the Rangers.  He hit his first major league home run on August 20 of that year. On September 8, he had his first multi-homer game in an 11–9 win over the Cleveland Indians.

Chicago Cubs
On April 19, 2013 the Chicago Cubs claimed Borbón off waivers.  He was designated for assignment on August 2, 2013.

Baltimore Orioles
Borbón was selected by the Baltimore Orioles in the Triple-A  phase of the Rule 5 Draft on December 12, 2013. He was assigned to AAA Norfolk Tides. He elected free agency on November 6, 2015.

On March 12, 2016, Borbón signed a minor league deal with the Baltimore Orioles. His contract was selected from the Bowie Baysox when the Orioles placed Hyun-soo Kim on the 15-day disabled list on July 19, 2016. Borbón made his first appearance in an MLB game in three years as an eighth-inning defensive substitute for center fielder Adam Jones in a 5–0 loss to the New York Yankees at Yankee Stadium on August 20. He made his first start with the Orioles in center field the next day, getting a single in three at bats and scoring a run in a 4–1 victory over the Yankees.

Acereros de Monclova
On April 11, 2017, Borbón signed with the Acereros de Monclova of the Mexican Baseball League.

Pericos de Puebla
He was traded to the Pericos de Puebla on July 1, 2017. He became a free agent following the season.

Somerset Patriots

On April 2, 2018, Borbón signed with the Somerset Patriots of the Atlantic League of Professional Baseball.

Sultanes de Monterrey
On July 17, 2018, Borbón signed with the Sultanes de Monterrey of the Mexican Baseball League.

Retirement 
Borbón announced his retirement on March 1, 2019.

Post-playing career
On March 1, 2019, Borbón announced that he joined the New York Yankees organization as a coach. In his first year, he served as a defensive coach for the Scranton/Wilkes-Barre RailRiders, with a focus on baserunning, outfield, and bunting instruction. In 2020, he moved into a new position as a defensive coach for the GCL Yankees East, but the season was later canceled due to the COVID-19 pandemic. In 2021, he stayed with the team, now re-named the FCL Yankees, and was promoted to manager. 

On January 30, 2022, Borbón announced he was leaving the Yankees and accepted a position with the Minnesota Twins in their Player Development department.

Personal
Borbón was born in Mississippi while his father attended Mississippi State University. He attended high school at De La Salle in Santo Domingo, Dominican Republic, graduating in 2004. After high school he attended the University of Tennessee on a baseball scholarship. He left Tennessee after his junior year and was taken by the Texas Rangers with the 35th pick in the 2007 MLB draft.  His brother, Edwin Borbón, played college baseball at Trevecca Nazarene University prior to his first two years at Tennessee junior college, Chattanooga State.

See also
Rule 5 draft results

References

External links

1986 births
Living people
Acereros de Monclova players
Águilas Cibaeñas players
American expatriate baseball players in the Dominican Republic
American expatriate baseball players in Mexico
American sportspeople of Dominican Republic descent
Arizona League Rangers players
Bakersfield Blaze players
Baltimore Orioles players
Baseball players from Mississippi
Bowie Baysox players
Chicago Cubs players
Cotuit Kettleers players
Frisco RoughRiders players
Iowa Cubs players
Leones del Escogido players
Major League Baseball center fielders
Mexican League baseball outfielders
Norfolk Tides players
Oklahoma City RedHawks players
Pericos de Puebla players
Round Rock Express players
Somerset Patriots players
Spokane Indians players
Sportspeople from Starkville, Mississippi
Surprise Rafters players
Texas Rangers players
Tigres del Licey players